The Last Party is a 1993 documentary film co-written by and starring Robert Downey Jr.

Topic 

Interviews and commentary cover moments of history during the 1992 presidential campaigns and investigate the issues of the day with Downey's particular brand of off-beat humor and satire.  Although Downey's political sympathies are clear in the film, he lampoons both Democrats and Republicans equally, and provides elements of general social commentary, as well. The film also provides a snap-shot of Robert Downey Jr., at a point in his life where he was falling into drug addiction that later led to an interruption in his career.

Appearances 

There are appearances of George H. W. Bush, Barbara Bush, Pat Buchanan, Bill Clinton, Patti Davis, Spike Lee, Jerry Brown, Roger Clinton, Oliver Stone, Al Sharpton, Dave Mustaine, G. Gordon Liddy, Marc Levin, Sean Penn, John Kerry, Peter Jennings, Jerry Falwell, Oliver North, Chelsea Clinton, Hillary Clinton, Mario Cuomo, John Dean, John Ehrlichman, Betty Friedan, Al Gore, Tipper Gore, H. R. Haldeman, Tom Hayden, Jesse Jackson, Ted Kennedy, Ross Perot, Dan Quayle, Dan Rather, Ronald Reagan, Ann Richards, Arnold Schwarzenegger, and Christian Slater.

Sequels 

Two sequel films were made following The Last Party, The Party's Over and The After Party: The Last Party 3.

References

External links 

1993 films
1993 documentary films
American documentary films
Documentary films about elections in the United States
1992 United States presidential election
Films directed by Marc Levin
Artisan Entertainment films
Films produced by Donovan Leitch (actor)
1990s English-language films
1990s American films